Solomon Ogbeide (died 20 May 2019) was a Nigerian football coach who coached club sides including Warri Wolves, Bayelsa United, and Lobi Stars.

References

Date of birth missing
2019 deaths
Nigerian football managers
Warri Wolves F.C. managers
Bayelsa United F.C. managers
Lobi Stars F.C. managers
Place of death missing
Year of birth missing
Place of birth missing